Helmut Wildt (9 April 1922 – 4 October 2007) was a German stage, film and television actor.

Selected filmography
 Black Gravel (1961)
 Life Begins at Eight (1962)
 The Lightship (1963)
 Piccadilly Zero Hour 12 (1963)
 The Dirty Game (1965)

References

Bibliography 
 Goble, Alan. The Complete Index to Literary Sources in Film. Walter de Gruyter, 1999.

External links 
 

1922 births
2007 deaths
German male stage actors
German male film actors
People from Bad Pyrmont